Ernst Stahl (14 January 1882 – 14 July 1957) was a German architect. His work was part of the architecture event in the art competition at the 1928 Summer Olympics.

References

1882 births
1957 deaths
20th-century German architects
Olympic competitors in art competitions
Architects from Stuttgart